Noor Jahaan is a 2018 Indo-Bangla joint production film directed by Abhimanyu Mukherjee and produced by Raj Chakraborty under the banners of Raj Chakraborty Production of India and Jaaz Multimedia of Bangladesh and co-produced by SVF Entertainment. The film features newcomer Adrit Roy and Puja Cherry in lead roles. It is remake of Marathi movie Sairat. It is shot in Krishnath College, Berhampore.

Plot 
Noor Jahaan is the story of two young lovers, Noor (played by Adrit Roy) and Jahaan (played by Puja Cherry). Noor is a poor boy who got the highest percentage in his district. Jahaan is a rich girl who is the daughter of a famous politician. Her mother, Amina Begum (played by Aparajita Auddy), finds them both and they get in trouble. They try to elope but fail. After this, they plan to run away again but almost get caught. They find one way of living together - that is death. It shows in the scene a climax where there is a pause. Noor and Jahaan dance the night away and she gets pregnant at their nuptial night.

Cast
 Adrit Roy as Noor
 Puja Cherry as Jahaan
 Aparajita Auddy as Amena Begum/Jahan's mother 
 Nader Chowdhury
 Supriyo Dutta
 Chikon Ali
 Faizan Ahmed Boby
 Shamim Ahamed

Production 
Noor Jahaan, an Indo-Bangladeshi joint venture, is co-produced by Raj Chakraborty Productions, SVF Entertainment and Jaaz Multimedia. By early July, Raj Chakraborty said that the film was nearly finished shooting its portion in Murshidabad, West Bengal and would start its Bangladesh portion soon. However, due to controversies of joint ventures in 2017, the government of Bangladesh began a temporary halt on international co-productions. Despite having 50% of the film's cast and crew being from Bangladesh, Raj Chakraborty claimed that at this point the future of the film was uncertain.

Release 
The film was originally scheduled to release on 1 September 2017, but the release was delayed due to the temporary ban on co-productions in Bangladesh. It was later announced that the film would release on 16 February 2018, on the weekend of Valentine's Day.

Soundtrack

 The soundtrack for Noor Jaahan is composed by Savvy Gupta. The single from the soundtrack, "Shona Bondhu",  was released on 20 July 2017, while the music video was released the same day. The song, composed by Savvy, sung by Raj Barman & Prashmita and with lyrics rewritten by Soumyadeb, is a remake of the classic song "Shona Bondhu" by Abdul Gafur Hali. The music video of the second single, "Mon Boleche", was released on 1 January 2018. "Mon Boleche", sung by Imran Mahmudul and Dilshad Nahar Kona, was announced on Jaaz Multimedia's Facebook page on 31 December 2017.

References

External links
 

2010s Bengali-language films
Bengali-language Indian films
Bengali-language Bangladeshi films
Jaaz Multimedia films